Kangaroo Palace is an Australian television drama miniseries which aired in 1997 on the Seven Network.

Plot summary 
In 1966, Catherine Macaleese (Jacqueline McKenzie) is counting the days until she meets her father, a distant childhood memory, and starts a new life with him in England. Heather Randall (Rebecca Gibney) is Catherine's cousin and closest friend who puts her marriage plans on hold to travel on the Oriana. Richard Turner (John Polson), an aspiring journalist, decides to try his luck on Fleet Street, and promises his fiancée, Sandy, that he will return in a few months. Jack Gill (Jeremy Sims), heading along a path of self-destruction, embarks on the journey at the last minute. On board, Jack disappears with the group's money and the trio arrive penniless. The only contact they have is a friend of Jack's, the mysterious Terence Foster-Burrows (Jonathan Firth). He shows little surprise for their predicament and offers them rooms in the Palace.

Cast

See also
Cinema of Australia

References

External links 
 Kangaroo Palace at the Internet Movie Database

1997 television films
1997 films
1997 drama films
Australian television films
Seven Network original programming
Films shot in Melbourne
1990s English-language films
Films directed by Robert Marchand